The Isidore H. Heller House is a house located at 5132 South Woodlawn Avenue in the Hyde Park community area of Chicago in Cook County, Illinois, United States. The house was designed by American architect Frank Lloyd Wright. The design is credited as one of the turning points in Wright's shift to geometric, Prairie School architecture, which is defined by horizontal lines, flat or hipped roofs with broad overhanging eaves, windows grouped in horizontal bands, and an integration with the landscape, which is meant to evoke native Prairie surroundings.

The work demonstrates Wright's shift away from emulating the style of his mentor, Louis Sullivan. Richard Bock, a Wright collaborator and sculptor, provided some of the ornamentation, including a plaster frieze. The ownership history of this building demonstrates the property's evolution and development in the framework of surrounding Hyde Park buildings, and the building's location in the current community—near other Prairie School architecture—includes this building into the overall body of Wright's work. The Heller House was designated a Chicago Landmark on September 15, 1971, and added to the National Register of Historic Places on March 16, 1972.  On August 18, 2004, the U.S. Department of the Interior designated the house a National Historic Landmark.

History
Little is known about Isidore H. Heller and his family, but what is known has been compiled through personal interviews as well as census and county records. Heller was born in Austria in 1847, and his wife, Ida, was born in Wisconsin in 1857. In America, Heller worked at Wolf, Sayer, and Heller: Packers and Butcher's Supplies, which was located on Fulton Street, Chicago, on the northwest side of the city. Heller and Ida were later married and had three children, including Walter Heller, a Chicago investment banker.

Heller purchased land in the Hyde Park area of Chicago from Jonas Hamburger on January 2, 1895, and commissioned Frank Lloyd Wright to design the house in 1896. A building permit was issued on July 13, 1897, at a cost of $7.70, and named William Adams as the builder. The building was constructed on the  lot in 1897. The total cost of the work is estimated at $12,500. In 1906, the lot was enlarged when Heller purchased an additional  to the north of his original plot.

The Hellers lived in the house for about 16 years, until the death of Ida Heller on October 11, 1909. The house was sold to Francis Bickett on June 18, 1913, as records indicate that by 1915, Heller had been living in Silver Lake for some years. Bickett sold the house within a year to Charles McFarlane, and from 1924–39 the Heller House was owned and occupied by Joseph Mayer and his wife; the house became known as the "Joseph Mayer House" to local residents. The Mayers sold the home to Mr. and Mrs. Wilfred Fox in 1939, who reportedly made alterations to the home's third floor.

In 1948, George Watson purchased the home from Fox and owned it for the next 25 years, becoming the owner with the longest tenure. Lewis Bradford then bought the house in 1972, and had the exterior sandblasted. In 1977, Victor and Danielle Barcilon bought the house. They occupied it until 1987, when it was sold to David and Catherine Epstein, who sold the home to Serafino Garella and Judith Bromley, in 1995. They restored a bathroom and restored the master bedroom's fireplace. The building was designated a National Historic Landmark in the same year.  The house was then sold in 2004 again to the Goldstein family.

Architecture

When Wright designed the Heller House in 1896, it marked his move away from styles that were popular into an era of geometric and highly modern designs. Wright's design exhibits the influence of Wright's mentor, Louis Sullivan, and demonstrates Wright's move towards Prairie School homes which would epitomize much of his early work. Sullivan's influence can also be seen in the floral pattern of the Richard Bock plaster frieze on the home's third floor, although during the 1970s, restoration work—which utilized sandblasting—destroyed much of the detail on the frieze.

The house was constructed on a narrow lot, so the main entryway is located on the side of the building, similar to Wright's Warren McArthur House of 1892. The south side entrance was adorned with Classical detailing and the cantilevered entry lintel, which sits on two ornately detailed stone columns, was decorated with quatrefoils which were set on a stone panel. The front room is not split by a corridor or side hall, making it more spacious.

Significance
The Heller House was Wright's first work in the Hyde Park neighborhood of Chicago, an area that was influenced by the Gothic Revival work of Henry Ives Cobb. The house blends together key elements of Wright's Prairie style and is located within a half mile of other early works. Wright's Robie House is six blocks from the Heller House, and the Blossom House and McArthur House are nearby, in Kenwood.

Many of the Hyde Park houses of Chicago are surrounded by elaborate gardens, and have been the subject of an ongoing neighborhood revitalization since the late 1950s. Hyde Park experienced an explosion of growth after the Township's incorporation into the city of Chicago in 1889, the establishment of the University of Chicago in 1892, and the Columbian Exposition in 1893. The design of the Heller House was unlike any other home in Chicago at the time it was built and was called Wright's most "outrageous" design.

See also

Emil Bach House
Frank Lloyd Wright Historic District
James Charnley House
Frank Lloyd Wright

Notes

References
Historic American Buildings Survey: data set
"A Note on the Chicago Fair of 1893 and Frank Lloyd Wright": Journal of the Society of Architectural Historians
Frank Lloyd Wright and the Fine Arts,": Perspecta
"Ornamentation and the Organic Architecture of Frank Lloyd Wright": Art Journal
""The Century's Triumph in Lighting": The Luxfer Prism Companies and Their Contribution to Early Modern Architecture": Journal of the Society of Architectural Historians
 Storrer, William Allin. The Frank Lloyd Wright Companion. University Of Chicago Press, 2006,  (S.038)

Frank Lloyd Wright buildings
Houses completed in 1897
Houses on the National Register of Historic Places in Chicago
National Historic Landmarks in Chicago
Chicago Landmarks